The Arts Centre Te Matatiki Toi Ora is a hub for arts, culture, education, creativity and entrepreneurship in Christchurch, New Zealand. It is located in the Gothic Revival former Canterbury College (now the University of Canterbury), Christchurch Boys' High School and Christchurch Girls' High School buildings, many of which were designed by Benjamin Mountfort. The centre is a national landmark and taonga as it is home to New Zealand's largest collection of category one heritage buildings with 21 of the 23 buildings covered by Heritage New Zealand listings.

The centre, which is held in trust for the people of Canterbury and its visitors, has been undergoing a large restoration since it was badly damaged in the 2011 Christchurch earthquake. Buildings are progressively reopening to the public as they are strengthened and repaired and more than two-thirds of the buildings have reopened.

Heritage
The Arts Centre Te Matatiki Toi Ora comprises 22 heritage buildings. The Student Union building was registered on 26 November 1981 and is a Category II entry. All buildings on the western half of the centre were registered as heritage buildings by the New Zealand Historic Places Trust on 15 February 1990 with registration number 7301 classified as A and B. With the change of the classification system, the buildings later became a Category I listing. The Registry Building in the northeast corner of the site was registered on 13 February 1997 and is a Category I listing.

The buildings are also listed in the Christchurch City Plan as heritage items. In the previous plan, 20 buildings were listed as Group 1 or 2, and three buildings were listed as Group 3. There are just two modern buildings on the site, with the Registry Additions built in 1957 and extended in 1967 and not listed under the old city plan, although it was proposed by the Christchurch City Council to include it in the listing with the historic registry building.

Usage
The restored Arts Centre Te Matatiki Toi Ora buildings are home to museums, including Rutherford's Den, where the father of nuclear physics Ernest, Lord Rutherford studied while at Canterbury College and the University of Canterbury's Teece Museum of Classical Antiquities, as well as boutique art galleries, eateries, retailers and offices.

The centre also hosts many special arts and cultural events, including a weekly market, and it has beautiful buildings and rooms available to hire. From 29 November to 1 December 2019, it hosted the NZ Skeptics Conference.

Before the 2011 earthquake The Court Theatre, a professional theatre company, was based at The Arts Centre from 1976 until 2010.

The Twelve Local Heroes is a series of bronze busts located on Worcester Boulevard outside The Arts Centre to commemorate twelve local Christchurch people who were prominent in their respective fields in the latter part of the 20th century. They are currently unavailable as the building adjacent to it is awaiting restoration.

Governance
The Arts Centre of Christchurch Incorporated was created in 1974, when the University of Canterbury completed its move to its new Ilam campus, and ownership of the site was transferred in 1978.

The Arts Centre Te Matatiki Toi Ora is governed by a charitable trust board. It relies solely on donations as it receives no ongoing funding from central or local governments. Its chief executive is Philip Aldridge, who took over the role in mid-2018 after the departure of André Lovatt.

Return of the university 
In 2009 strong debate emerged over a proposal to use The Arts Centre Te Matatiki Toi Ora car park located off Hereford Street for the University of Canterbury's School of Music. Proponents valued the additional vibrancy that this would bring into the Cultural Precinct, and supported the university moving back to their original site. Opponents felt that the proposed building was out of scale with the existing Arts Centre and that the building design would detract from the heritage value. Ultimately the proposal was abandoned after a successful campaign by Save our Arts Centre, a group led by Richard Sinke.

In May 2017, the university opened two departments in the restored old Chemistry building – the classics and music school. Some 400 students transfer from the Ilam campus to the central city facility.

2010 earthquake damage
In the early hours of 4 September 2010, a major earthquake caused extensive damage throughout the Canterbury region. The Arts Centre Te Matatiki Toi Ora buildings were damaged – collapsing chimneys damaged the Great Hall, the Observatory Tower and the Clock Tower. The then Arts Centre director Ken Franklin commented that prior measures taken to reinforce the buildings may have prevented additional damage. The buildings had been insured for NZ$95 million, and this was increased to NZ$120m in January 2011.

2011 earthquake damage
The Arts Centre Te Matatiki Toi Ora was very badly damaged in the 22 February 2011 Christchurch earthquake, but no people were hurt at the centre. All historic buildings became inaccessible to the public and the entire complex was closed until the first restored and strengthened building, The Registry Building reopened in 2013.

Earthquake recovery
It was initially estimated the cost to repair The Arts Centre Te Matatiki Toi Ora would be NZ$100m. This was later revised to more than NZ$200m and estimated to take 15 years to accomplish. In July 2012, it was announced that André Lovatt had been secured as its new chief executive, tasking him with the restoration project; Lovatt started in October 2012. Under Lovatt's guidance, the programme was accelerated although with the scope becoming better known, the costs escalated to NZ$290m making it one of the largest heritage restoration projects in the world.

The massive restoration programme immaculately restores and strengthens the heritage features of the centre's unique heritage buildings, while fitting them out with the latest modern facilities. With more than two-thirds of the centre open again, it is home to museums, art galleries, boutique eateries and retailers, offices, arts and cultural events, a weekly market and venues for hire.

While a significant amount of the restoration has been paid for, there is still a substantial shortfall in funds to complete it and the charitable trust is actively fundraising with the next stage to include the $10m restoration of the Observatory Tower and the restoration of the Physics, Biology and Engineering buildings. The Physics and Biology buildings will become home to a boutique hotel. The Observatory Hotel opened in the restored Townsend Observatory  in 2022.

The first buildings to reopen after the earthquake were Registry, Registry Additions and The Gym with Registry reopening in July 2013. The Great Hall opened in June 2016.

References

External links
The Arts Centre Te Matatiki Toi Ora website

 
Gothic Revival architecture in New Zealand